Edgecliff railway station is located on the Eastern Suburbs line, serving the Sydney suburb of Edgecliff. It is served by Sydney Trains T4 Eastern Suburbs & Illawarra Line services and NSW TrainLink South Coast Line services.

History
Whilst the Eastern Suburbs Railway was not originally intended to travel via Edgecliff, the first proposal for an Edgecliff station was in 1947. In 1963 it was suggested that Edgecliff be the terminus of the first stage of the railway, but by 1967 it was decided Bondi Junction was a better terminus location.

Edgecliff station opened on 23 June 1979 when the Eastern Suburbs line opened from Central to Bondi Junction.

Although not directly mentioned in projects associated with the Rail Clearways Program, work was taken out at Edgecliff as a part of the Bondi Junction Turnback project. This involved the motorisation and signalling of an emergency crossover located at the western end of the station. Previously it had not been possible to ordinarily terminate trains at Edgecliff. When completed in September 2004 it permitted trains to terminate at Edgecliff and return towards the city. This was necessary to allow the closing of Bondi Junction station while major work was carried out there but allowing the line to otherwise remain open.

On 15 January 2014, a Tangara derailed just past Edgecliff. It was found that an incorrect repair had been done to one of the axles of the train in 1998–1999, leading to the axle eventually breaking. During the derailment, a piece of metal, used for the edge of a concrete slab on the track, was lifted and pierced into the passenger cabin, almost injuring several passengers.

An accessibility upgrade for the station was announced in September 2015. In June 2019, the new access ramp on New McLean Street was opened and the bus canopy extension completed. The upgrade is now complete.

Platforms & services

Bus Interchange

Upon opening most bus services travelling past the station towards the city were curtailed to terminate at the station. Despite the 1976 review that caused the design of the bus interchanges at Edgecliff and Bondi Junction to be scaled back, significant work was completed at Edgecliff to better facilitate these bus route changes: a tunnel had been dug under Ocean Street and Edgecliff Road, around the Edgecliff Post Office to New South Head Road.

However, because the time savings of the train over the bus from Edgecliff were minimal and integrated ticketing was not available, fewer passengers than anticipated opted to change modes at the interchange. As initially configured, the westernmost platform was reserved for arrivals, with 11 stands spread across four platforms for departures with a stabling facility at the eastern end.

In June 2002, the status of the interchange declined with a number of the routes that terminated at Edgecliff either cancelled or extended through to the city, operating directly via New South Head Road. It is now used only by services to the city from Bondi Junction (and vice versa) plus those from the city to the Eastern Suburbs continuing east along New South Head Road.

The former control room has been leased to non government organisation Holdsworth Community along with the former bus stabling area.

The following routes operate from Edgecliff Interchange. All routes operated by the Transdev John Holland.

Stand A:
200: to Bondi Junction station via Woollahra
328: to Bondi Junction station

Stand B:
323: to Dover Heights

Stand C:
324: to Watsons Bay via Old South Head Road
325: to Watsons Bay via Vaucluse

Stand D:
326: to Bondi Junction station via Victoria Road
327: to Bondi Junction Interchange via Bellevue Road

Stand E:
328: to Darling Point

New South Head Road
200: to Gore Hill
324: to Walsh Bay
325: to Walsh Bay

Edgecliff station is served by one Nightride route:
N91: Bondi Junction station to Macquarie Park station

Trackplan

References

External links

 Edgecliff Station at Transport for New South Wales (Archived 10 June 2019)
Edgecliff station Public Transport Map Transport for NSW

Easy Access railway stations in Sydney
Railway stations located underground in Sydney
Railway stations in Australia opened in 1979
Eastern Suburbs railway line
Municipality of Woollahra